'Vilajota (possibly from Aymara wila blood, blood-red, quta lake, "red lake") is mountain in the Carabaya mountain range in the Andes of Peru, about  high. It is located in the Puno Region, Carabaya Province, in the southwest of the Ituata District, near the border with the Macusani District. Vilajota lies north of Tocsajota, northeast of a lake named Tocsajota and northwest of Allpajata.

References 

Mountains of Peru
Mountains of Puno Region